Koyuk may refer to:
 Koyuk, Alaska
 Koyuk River
 Koyuk Alfred Adams Airport
 Köyük (disambiguation), several places in Azerbaijan